Heikki Taskinen (27 March 1888, in Nilsiä – 25 April 1952) was a Finnish farmer and politician. He was a member of the Parliament of Finland from 1919 to 1922, representing the Agrarian League.

References

1888 births
1952 deaths
People from Nilsiä
People from Kuopio Province (Grand Duchy of Finland)
Centre Party (Finland) politicians
Members of the Parliament of Finland (1919–22)